Synaphea interioris is a shrub endemic to Western Australia.

It usually blooms between July and October producing yellow flowers.

It is found on undulating plains in the Wheatbelt, Great Southern and Goldfields-Esperance regions of Western Australia where it grows in sandy-loamy-gravelly soils.

References

Eudicots of Western Australia
interioris
Endemic flora of Western Australia
Plants described in 1995